Balstonia is an urban area within the unitary authority of Thurrock in Essex, England.  It is contiguous with the towns of Stanford-le-Hope and Corringham.

Thurrock